Giulio Bizzozero (20 March 1846 – 8 April 1901) was an Italian doctor and medical researcher. He was a pioneer of histology and is credited with the coining of the term platelets and identifying their function in coagulation.

Background 
Bizzozero was born in Varese, Lombardy to Felice and Carolina Veratti. The family were involved in the Risorgimento, an older brother Cesare fought against Austria while Carolina served as a volunteer nurse. After high school, he studied medicine at the University of Pavia, where he performed histological and histopathological research under the guidance of Paolo Mantegazza (1831-1910) and the microscopist Eusebio Oehl. In 1866 he graduated from Pavia at the age of 20. He then travelled and worked with Rudolf Virchow in Berlin and Heinrich Frey in Zurich. In 1867, he was chosen as the chief of general pathology and histology at the University of Pavia. This institute trained many important Italian researchers, such as Camillo Golgi (1843–1926). 

In 1872, at the age of 26, he moved to the University of Turin, and founded the Institute of General Pathology. While at Turin he worked to improve hygiene and water supply. Among the physicians who worked and studied in his laboratory at Turin were Edoardo Bassini (1844-1924) and Carlo Forlanini (1847-1918).

In April 1901, he died of pneumonia. For his scientific achievements, Bizzozero was named by king Humbert I, a life senator in 1890.

Achievements 
Bizzozero was one of the pioneers of histology, and, more generally, the use of the microscope in medical research. He is known for his early description of Helicobacter pylori (1892), the bacteria that is responsible for peptic ulcer disease (although this fact was not generally accepted until the 1990s).

In 1869 he noted the value of blood transfusions in treating anemia. In 1881 he described platelets as a third element in blood after the erythrocytes and leucocytes. Platelets had been described by Max Schultze in 1865 but Bizzozero identified their function. He called them petit plaques (Italian), plaquettes (French) and Blutplattchenin (German). He demonstrated their role in clotting through aggregation and clumping with the formation of thread like structures now known as fibrin.

Other significant work by Bizzozero included research of haematopoiesis in the bone marrow, studies involving phagocytosis in the eye, and the identification of desmosomes (nodes of Bizzozero), structures that he first discovered in the stratum spinosum of epidermis.

See also 
 Timeline of peptic ulcer disease and Helicobacter pylori
 Pathology
 List of pathologists

References

Sources

External links

 A brief biography

1846 births
1901 deaths
University of Pavia alumni
Academic staff of the University of Pavia
Academic staff of the University of Turin
People from Varese
Italian anatomists
Members of the Senate of the Kingdom of Italy
Italian pathologists
Deaths from pneumonia in Piedmont
Histologists
Hygienists